Philautus everetti is a species of frog in the family Rhacophoridae found in the Philippines and Malaysia. Its natural habitats are subtropical or tropical moist lowland forests, subtropical or tropical moist montane forests, and rivers. It is threatened by habitat loss. In Borneo, this species occurs in the mountainous area from Gunung Kinabalu National Park in Sabah to Gunung Mulu National Park in Sarawak.

References

everetti
Amphibians of the Philippines
Endemic fauna of the Philippines
Taxonomy articles created by Polbot
Amphibians described in 1894